David Wendel Carter High School (commonly referred to as Dallas Carter) is a public high school located in the Oak Cliff area of Dallas, Texas, United States. The school is a part of the Dallas Independent School District and is classified as a 4A school by the UIL. In 2015, the school was rated "Met Standard" by the Texas Education Agency.

History 
The school was built in 1965 and is named after David Wendel Carter, a doctor and member of the DISD school board. He served on the school board for 25 years, from 1925 to 1950, longer than any other member. Carter also served as the school board's president for 16 years. The school graduated its first class of seniors in 1968.

The school initially drew students from Justin F. Kimball High School; the two schools maintain a highly competitive rivalry to this day.  The two schools face each other annually in football as "The Oak Cliff Super Bowl."

In 2005, after the closure of the Wilmer-Hutchins Independent School District, Carter absorbed some WHISD high school students.

In 2011 the district re-opened Wilmer Hutchins High School. Some former WHISD zones covered by Carter were rezoned to Wilmer-Hutchins.

Athletics
The David W. Carter Cowboys compete in the following sports:

Baseball
Basketball
Cross Country
Football
Golf
Soccer
Softball
Swimming and Diving
Tennis
Track and Field
Volleyball
Wrestling

Feeder patterns 
As of 2006, William H. Atwell and D. A. Hulcy Middle School feed into David W. Carter High School.

Adelle Turner, Mark Twain Vanguard, and T. G. Terry Elementary Schools feed into William H. Atwell Middle School, and Birdie Alexander, Umphrey Lee, Ronald E. McNair, and Martin Weiss Elementary Schools feed into D. A. Hulcy Middle School, all of which ultimately feed into David W. Carter High School.

Notable alumni 
Clifton Abraham (class of 1990): American and Canadian football player
Jessie Armstead (class of 1989): American football linebacker from 1993 to 2003 (New York Giants, Washington Redskins)
Joe Burch (class of 1989): American football offensive and defensive lineman
Jerametrius Butler: American football cornerback at Kansas State and later the St. Louis Rams, Washington Redskins, Buffalo Bills, and New Orleans Saints.  
Jeremy Combs (born 1995), basketball player for Israeli team Hapoel Ramat Gan Givatayim
Michael Crabtree (class of 2006): wide receiver for the Baltimore Ravens; first-team All-American for Texas Tech
 Adrian Hamilton (class of 2006): NFL linebacker with the Baltimore Ravens since 2012
Ennis Haywood (class of 1998): American football running back for the Dallas Cowboys
Greg Hill (class of 1990): professional American football running back from 1994 to 1999
Darren "Tank" Lewis (class of 1987): American former professional football player in the early 1990s
DeMarcus Love (class of 2006): American football offensive tackle for the Minnesota Vikings since 2011
Le'Shai Maston (class of 1989): American football running back from 1993 to 1998
Liz Mikel (class of 1981): actress in stage, television, and film and jazz singer; noted roles in the movie Welcome Home Roscoe Jenkins and TV series Friday Night Lights
Sha'Carri Richardson (class of 2018): Track and field sprinter who as a freshman at Louisiana State University, ran the 100m in 10.75 seconds to break the World U20 record. 
Mark Sanford (transferred to Lincoln High School of San Diego): basketball player in the NBA from 1997 to 2002
DeWayne Scales (class of 1977): basketball player in the NBA and CBA from 1980 to 1986
Jonathan Scott (class of 2001): American football offensive tackle 
Vernon Smith (class of 1977): professional basketball player
Craig Watkins (class of 1986): Dallas County District Attorney since 2007; first African American to hold such office both county and statewide

Notable faculty
Freddie James, head football coach from 1982 to 1995

See also

Carter High, a movie based on Carter's 1988 football team.

References

External links
 

High schools in Dallas
Educational institutions established in 1965
Dallas Independent School District high schools
1965 establishments in Texas